Teochew string music or Chaozhou xianshi ( also called "string-poem music") is classed as a type of  music (chamber music for strings and woodwind, literally 'silk/bamboo') although it typically uses stringed instruments only. It is found in northeastern Guangdong and parts of Fujian and also in regions with overseas Teochew populations, such as Malaysia, Singapore, Thailand, and the United States. The Chaoshan region of Guangdong, bordering on Fujian and comprising the cities of Chaozhou, Shantou and Jieyang, forms its own cultural sphere. Teahouses often accompany with Chaozhou music.

History
Developed from a fusion of elements, popular song, arias of Chinese opera, ancient melodies and pieces of Buddhist music, string music falls into two styles:  is music of the Confucian school that can be performed as an independent instrumental music genre or at weddings and other ceremonies and that aims at elegance and nobility, while  is principally the music of the theatre, though it may be played independently: it cultivates a sober, rustic style.

Instruments
Cello is sometimes also used, particularly in the style performed in the area of Shantou.

Characteristics
  ('Grief of Wang Zhaojun')
 
  ('Jackdaws Play in the Water')
  ('The Oriole's Cry')
  ('High Moon')
  ('Great Eight Beats')
  ('Flock of Geese on the Shore')
  ('The Male Phoenix Seeks the Female')
  ('Five Knots of the Chain')
  ('Adding Flowers upon Brocade')

The form of each of these pieces resembles a suite of variations upon a stock melody (qupai or 'noted tune'). These are called  or 'beat' variations and follow an ordered sequence with changes of tempo and measure (most pieces have six or eight beat measures). Augmentation and diminution of the melody is used, so that it may repeatedly double in speed through the variations. The technique of  introduces a division-like filling in of the melody with figures such as repeated notes and neighbouring or passing notes. Perfect-fourth transposition of the melody also occurs, though the tonal centre remains constant.

Four or five main modes are traditionally identified. However, while elsewhere in China such modes are mainly defined by absolute pitch and by the degree of the pentatonic scale that is taken as the key-note (thus setting the intervals of the scale), the  conception of mode, rather like the Indian raga system, includes motif, ornament and intonation. Pitch is not absolute but the scale is usually constructed on a key-note approximating to western concert F – F. Modes are pentatonic but all derive from a seven-note scale: no notice is taken of the starting and finishing tones of the melody in determining the mode and the key-note remains the same in every mode. Tunes may be adapted to a new mode, but the mode remains constant throughout any performance of the suite.

Apart from the major pentatonic scale two further tones, corresponding to a (sharp) perfect fourth and a (flat) major seventh, are employed. The "missing" steps of the scale in each mode may be used in ornament but are not part of main mode structure. The mode  ("Light III Light VI") is the standard major pentatonic. But  ("Light III Heavy VI") calls for a heavy string-pressure upon the sixth degree, raising it to the seventh.  ("Heavy III Heavy VI"), similarly, applies this upward string-bend to the third degree as well, raising it to the fourth. The fourth common scale, called  ("Live V"), resembles this last but avoids the plain third degree and instead uses a heavy vibrato on the second degree. This is said to be the most characteristic mode of the region.

Chaozhou drum music includes the big drum and gong, the small drum and gong, the dizi set drum and dong and su drum and gong ensembles. The current Chaozhou drum music is said to be similar to the form of the Drum and Wind Music of the Han and Tang Dynasties.

References

Anon, Sizhu yue : musique poétique à cordes de Chaozhou, China.org, retrieved April 2009 
Prof. Mercedes M. Dujunco, The Birth of a New Mode? Modal Entities in the Chaozhou Xianshi String Ensemble Music Tradition of Guangdong, South China, in Ethnomusicology Online, Issue 8, 2003, University of Maryland, Baltimore County, retrieved April 2009 

Chinese styles of music
Teochew music